Vakhtang I (Vakhtang I Mukhranbatoni) (1511 – 1 October 1580) was a Georgian tavadi ("prince") of the House of Mukhrani, a collateral branch of the royal Bagrationi dynasty of Kartli, and Prince (batoni) of Mukhrani from 1539 until his death. At the same time, he was an ex officio commander of the Banner of Shida Kartli. In the absence of his relative, King Simon I of Kartli, in the captivity in Safavid Iran, Vakhtang was installed by the nobility as a regent in opposition to the pro-Safavid regime of Daud-Khan from 1569 to 1579.

Family background 
Vakhtang was a son of Prince Bagrat, the founder of the House of Mukhrani and a younger son of Constantine II, the last de jure king of a unified Georgia. He was, therefore, first cousin to King Luarsab I of Kartli and first cousin once removed to Luarsab's son and successor, Simon I. Among his siblings were a sister, Dedisimedi, and brothers, Ashotan and Archil.

Prince of Mukhrani 
Vakhtang succeeded as Prince of Mukhrani on retirement of his father to a monastery in 1539. During his tenure, Mukhrani, a buffer zone on the border with the rivaling Georgian kingdom of Kakheti, experienced several military conflicts. In 1554, the Safavid invasion forced Vakhtang and his family into a temporary exile to Samtskhe. One of brothers, Archil, was captured by the Iranian military in 1557 and another, Ashotan, was killed when the mountaineers of Pkhovi raided Mukhrani in 1561.

Regent of Kartli  
In 1569, the Safavid forces made Simon I of Kartli prisoner and the shah Tahmasp I placed Simon's Islamized brother David (Daud-Khan) on the throne of Kartli. David's authority was limited to the areas tightly controlled by the Iranian military as most of the Christian nobles of Kartli refused to recognize a Muslim overlord and made Vakhtang a regent of Kartli. In 1578, Kartli once again became a battleground of the Ottoman–Safavid war. After Daud-Khan burned down his capital, Tbilisi, before abandoning it to the Ottoman army under Lala Kara Mustafa Pasha, Vakhtang, as a regent of Kartli, sent Bardzim, Prince Amilakhvari, and Elizbar, Duke of Ksani, to come to common terms with the victor, saving, as the 18th-century historian Prince Vakhushti put it, "the people from annihilation".

In October 1578, Simon I, released by the shah from captivity, returned to Kartli and struck at the Ottoman garrisons as well as his old foes. One of them, Bardzim Amilakhvari, was arrested and, as Vakhtang tried to intercede, he too was imprisoned by Simon at the castle of Kekhvi. Simon's wife, Nestan-Darejan, moderated the king's anger and Vakhtang was soon released. He died shortly thereafter, in 1580, being succeeded as Prince of Mukhrani by his son, Teimuraz I, under the regency of Vakhtang's nephew Erekle I.

Marriage and children 
Vakhtang was married to a certain Khvaramze and had three sons: Teimuraz I, Prince of Mukhrani (died 1 July 1625), Kaikhosro (died 3 October 1629), and Bagrat (born 16 July 1572). The historian Cyril Toumanoff considers Teimuraz and Bagrat to have been the same person.

References

1511 births
1580 deaths
House of Mukhrani
Regents of Georgia
16th-century people from Georgia (country)